Ivindomyrus is a genus of elephantfishes native to rivers in Middle Africa.

Species
There are currently two recognized species in this genus:

 Ivindomyrus marchei (Sauvage 1879) (Ogooue mormyrid)
 Ivindomyrus opdenboschi Taverne & Géry, 1975 (Ivindo mormyrid)

References

Mormyridae
Ray-finned fish genera
Weakly electric fish